Hallicis is a genus of moths in the family Blastobasidae.

Species
Hallicis bisetosellus Adamski, 2013
Hallicis clavicula Adamski, 2013

References

Blastobasidae genera